St Clair McAlister is a former Unionist politician in Northern Ireland.

McAlister was elected to the Northern Ireland Forum in 1996 as a Democratic Unionist Party (DUP) representative for North Down.
He failed to be elected to Ards Borough Council in 1997, and lost his seat at the 1998 Northern Ireland Assembly election.

McAlister was later appointed as the DUP's Director of Communications, then wrote a weekly opinion column for the Belfast Newsletter. An architect by profession, McAlister has since retired from politics entirely, returning to business and private pursuits.

External links
1996 election history
1997 election history

Living people
Democratic Unionist Party politicians
Members of the Northern Ireland Forum
Year of birth missing (living people)
Place of birth missing (living people)